Tadpole was a New Zealand rock band from Auckland led by female vocalist Renée Brennan. The band formed in June 1994 and broke apart in late 2006 after numerous changes to the line-up.

Career

Before 2000 
Between the band's beginning and 1999, Tadpole went through many line-up changes. At one point, the members were all female except one. Vocalist Renée Brennan and drummer/manager Dean Lawton have been stable members of the band since the late 1990's.

During that time, the singles "Blind" (radio release only, 1998), "For Me" (single release, 1999), and "Backdoor" (also a single release, 1999), were released.

In regards to the song "Backdoor", the band stated "[it] was about our struggle thus far to make it in the New Zealand music industry and the initial frustration of trying to get our music played on radio, TV, or anywhere really. The 'backdoor' part came about because we felt we were never going to be accepted by the student radio stations, we'd just have to come in through the back door somehow. And yes, for those who want to know, the metaphor of anal sex is intended. I liken our struggle to getting buggered over, and over, and over again. In a very loving and tongue in cheek way."

2000–2002 
Their debut album The Buddhafinger, was released in New Zealand in 2000 and proved to be a huge hit, debuting at #2 on the Official New Zealand Top 40 Albumschart. The Buddhafinger had a distinctive pop/punkish slant to it, and featured part-time vinyl scratcher, DJ Kritikl (Kevin May), on most tracks. The 2000 line-up officially consisted of Renée Brennan (vocals), Dean Lawton (drums), Chris Yong (guitar), Paul Matthews (bass) and DJ Kritikl. The latter would leave the lineup late in 2000, and the band reverted to a four-piece.

In January 2002, Paul Matthews left to concentrate on work with fellow New Zealand band Stylus. After a few months' speculation, his place was taken by Hamilton bass player Shannon Brown, previously from the band Mama Said.

August 2002 came the follow-up album, The Medusa which was also a top 10 hit. In contrast with The Buddhafinger, The Medusa had "a much darker, at times menacing sound".

2003–2006 
In February 2003 came a large upheaval to the band. Citing musical differences, both guitarist Chris Yong and bassist Shannon Brown left. Both would go into other bands, Redline and 48May respectively.

For months after Tadpole played sporadically with temporary guitar/bass parts, before settling on two new members, Henry Penny and Ollie Gordon. This line-up kept a low profile during 2004–2005, playing four to five gigs at a time, rather than whole tours.

Tadpole toured several times in New Zealand and played gigs all around the world. In February 2005, their third album Tadpole was recorded; however it took a year and a half for its release. During that time, the singles  "Too Hard" and "Yesterday" were released to New Zealand radio and video stations.

Split 
In June 2006, the band announced it was breaking up after a final Auckland concert and the release of their self-titled album Tadpole.

In November 2022 members of the band released The Tadpole Collection (1994-2006), a four disc set collating their three released albums as well as a new album called Remains of the Day covering their B sides and other unreleased tracks.

Discography

Albums

Compilations

EPs

Singles

References

External links 
 MySpace Website
 AudioCulture profile

New Zealand rock music groups